The Soboth Pass (elevation 1347 m) is a high mountain pass in the Alps, located north of the border between Austria and Slovenia in the Austrian states of Styria and Carinthia connecting Soboth and Lavamünd.

References

See also
 List of highest paved roads in Europe
 List of mountain passes

Mountain passes of the Alps
Mountain passes of Styria
Mountain passes of Carinthia (state)